Kings Norton Town F.C. was an English association football club based in Kings Norton, Birmingham. They entered the Midland Combination in 1991 and quickly rose up the leagues during the mid-1990s, reaching the Midland Alliance by 1997. After entering the FA Cup for the first time in 1999, the club folded in 2000.

History

Originally known as Swift Personalised Products F.C., the club entered the Midland Football Combination Division Two in 1991. After changing their name to Richmond Swifts F.C. in 1994, the club won three successive promotions to take it to the Midland Alliance in 1997. The club then changed its name to Kings Norton Town, and finished runners-up in 1998–99. In 1999–2000, Kings Norton entered the FA Cup for the first time, but failed to make it beyond the preliminary qualifying rounds. At the end of the season, the club folded.

Ground

The team played at the Triplex Sports Ground in Kings Norton; during their time in the Midland Football Alliance they ground shared with Redditch United.

Honours
Midland Alliance
Runners-up 1998–99
Midland Combination Premier Division
Champions 1996–97
Midland Combination Division One
Champions 1995–96
Midland Combination Division Two
Champions 1994–95

Records
FA Cup
Preliminary Round 1999–2000
FA Vase
First Round 1999–2000

References

Defunct football clubs in England
Sport in Birmingham, West Midlands
Association football clubs disestablished in 2000
2000 disestablishments in England
Defunct football clubs in the West Midlands (county)
Midland Football Alliance
Midland Football Combination